Werth is a surname. Notable people with the surname include:

Alexander Werth (1901–1969), Russian-British writer and journalist
Dennis Werth (born 1952), baseball first baseman and outfielder
Erik Werth, TV news producer 
Henrik Werth (1881–1952), Hungarian general
Isabell Werth (born  1969), German equestrian
Jayson Werth (born 1979), American baseball outfielder
Johann von Werth (1591–1652), German general 
Joseph Werth (born 1952), Bishop of Siberia and the Russian Far East
Kurt Werth (1896–1983), German children’s books illustrator
Leon Werth (1878–1955), French writer and art critic
Nicolas Werth (born in 1950), French historian, son of Alexander Werth
Peter Werth, a British upmarket clothing retailer
Karl Werth (Born 1981), Former Independent Professional Wrestler and current Podcaster

See also
13559 Werth, a main-belt asteroid